Masud Khaddarposh (1916-1985) was a bureaucrat, Pakistan movement activist, agricultural reformist and a champion of the Punjabi language. He was born on June 25, 1916 in the Gumti Bazaar area of Lahore. He died on December 25, 1985, in the city of his birth. 
Justice Anwaar ul Haq is reported to have said that in 1939 only nine out of 600 candidates qualified for the ICS exam out of which five were Muslims, including himself, Saeed Jafri, Muhammad Masud, Ikram Ahmad Khan and KS Islam. Masud joined the Indian Civil Service in 1941 and retired in 1972 in Pakistan. He is still remembered as one of the pioneers of agricultural reforms in Pakistan. He was a role model for young civil servants due to his uprightness and selfless service. He was appointed in Sindh. He always wore Khaddar, a traditionally made simple cotton cloth. That's why Fatima Jinnah gave him the title Khadsarposh, which means a person who wears khaddar.

Pakistan Movement

Masud was transferred to Nawabshah as Deputy Commissioner in 1946.  He accompanied Mohammad Ali Jinnah to Quetta and played some role in persuading the tribal chiefs of Baluchistan to join Pakistan. In the partition, he continued in the same post in Nawabshah district of Sindh. Later, he served as deputy commissioner in Muzaffargarh and in the Board of Revenue, Punjab government, Pakistan.

Sindh Hari Committee Report
Before 1947, the Sindh government formed a committee, with Sir Roger Thomas as its chairman. Other members included Noordeen Siddique and Masood Khadarposh. Agha Shahi was the secretary of committee. Because Masood Khadarpoosh considered the report to be misleading and did not agree with the contents, he wrote a dissenting note. Due to his note and public pressure, the Pakistan government instituted land reforms.

See also
 http://www.apnaorg.com/articles/khaddarposh/
 http://www.apnaorg.com/articles/khaddarposh/book.html

References

1985 deaths
1916 births